Just Before Losing Everything (original title Avant que de tout perdre) is a 2013 short film by French film maker Xavier Legrand.  It was nominated for an Academy Award for Best Live Action Short Film. The film follows the day in the life of a woman who has decided to leave her abusive husband. The story was continued (with the same actors playing the mother, father, and daughter) in Legrand's feature-length follow-up, Custody.

Plot
A small boy (Julien) leaves his house and walks down the street.  He runs into his teacher and tells her he is going to pick up cigarettes for his Dad.  The teacher reminds him of the teacher conferences tomorrow.  The boy walks down the street and goes under a bridge.  His mother (Miriam) picks him up.  They drive to a bus stop and pick up his crying sister (Josephine).

They drive to Miriam's work at a Wal-Mart like store.  She leaves her kids with a co-worker and speaks with her boss.  She informs him that she needs to leave tonight.  He asks if she is going to file charges against her husband and Miriam states that there is no time.  The boss agrees to fire her so she can receive a severance package.

Before they can leave the store, Miriam's husband Antoine comes to talk to her.  Julien and Josephine cry and beg her not to talk to him.  Miriam changes out of her regular clothes to her store uniform revealing cuts and bruises on her body.  He asks for the check book, apparently unaware of Miriam's plan.  She gives it to him and walks away.

She and her children leave the store to meet her sister and her sister's husband.  They see Antoine in the parking lot and hide from him behind the other cars.  He drives away, and they run across the parking lot to Miriam's sister's car.

In the last shot, a car which may or may not be Antoine's turns to follow them.

Cast
 Léa Drucker as Miriam
 Anne Benoît as Gaelle
 Denis Ménochet as Antoine
 Milgan Chatelain as Julien
 Mathilde Auneveux as Josephine
 Émilie Gavois-Kahn as Sylvie

Accolades

References

External links
 

2013 films
2013 short films
French short films
2013 drama films
2010s French films